Soperton is a city in Treutlen County, Georgia, United States. The population was 3,115 at the 2010 census, up from 2,824 in 2000. The city is the county seat of Treutlen County.

History
A post office was established at Soperton in 1902. The city was named after Benjamin Franklin Soper, a railroad official.

The Georgia General Assembly incorporated Soperton as a town in 1902.

Geography
Soperton is located at  (32.376067, -82.592724).

Demographics

2020 census

As of the 2020 United States census, there were 2,889 people, 1,088 households, and 699 families residing in the city.

2000 census
As of the census of 2000, there were 2,824 people, 1,096 households, and 737 families residing in the city. The racial makeup of the city was 46.67% White, 51.84% African American, 0.04% Native American, 0.35% Asian, 0.39% from other races, and 0.71% from two or more races. Hispanic or Latino of any race were 0.92% of the population.

There were 1,096 households, out of which 32.8% had children under the age of 18 living with them, 36.4% were married couples living together, 26.4% had a female householder with no husband present, and 32.7% were non-families. 29.7% of all households were made up of individuals, and 15.1% had someone living alone who was 65 years of age or older.  The average household size was 2.49 and the average family size was 3.09.

In the city, the population was spread out, with 28.3% under the age of 18, 9.4% from 18 to 24, 26.6% from 25 to 44, 20.4% from 45 to 64, and 15.4% who were 65 years of age or older.  The median age was 34 years. For every 100 females, there were 82.2 males.  For every 100 females age 18 and over, there were 73.8 males.

The median income for a household in the city was $20,471, and the median income for a family was $26,042. Males had a median income of $24,643 versus $18,646 for females. The per capita income for the city was $12,367.  About 29.3% of families and 31.7% of the population were below the poverty line, including 35.4% of those under age 18 and 34.8% of those age 65 or over.

Education

Treutlen County School District 
The Treutlen County School District holds pre-school to grade twelve, and consists of one elementary school and a middle/high school. The district has 74 full-time teachers and over 1,234 students.
Treutlen Elementary School
Treutlen Middle/High School

References

Cities in Georgia (U.S. state)
Cities in Treutlen County, Georgia
County seats in Georgia (U.S. state)